The 2019 Women's National Invitation Tournament was a single-elimination tournament of 64 NCAA Division I teams that were not selected to participate in the 2019 Women's NCAA tournament. The tournament committee announced the 64-team field on March 18, following the selection of the NCAA Tournament field. The tournament began on March 20, 2019, and concluded on April 6, 2019, with the championship game televised on the CBS Sports Network. In the championship game, Arizona defeated Northwestern 56–42 to win the tournament.

Participants
The 2019 Postseason WNIT field consists of 30 automatic invitations – one from each conference – and 34 at-large teams. Utah and LSU declined their respective automatic invitations. The declined spots were filled as part of the at–large selection process.  The intention of the WNIT Selection Committee was to select the best available at-large teams in the nation. Teams with the highest finishes in their conferences’ regular-season standings that were not selected for the NCAA Tournament were offered an automatic berth. The remaining berths in the WNIT were filled by the best teams available. Teams considered for an at–large berth have overall records of .500 or better.

Automatic qualifiers

At-large bids

Source:

Bracket
All times are listed as Eastern Daylight Time (UTC−4)
* – Denotes overtime period

Semifinals and Championship Game

Semifinals

Championship

All-tournament team
 Aari McDonald (Arizona), MVP
 Cat Reese (Arizona)
 Veronica Burton (Northwestern)
 Lindsey Pulliam (Northwestern)
 Jackie Benitez (James Madison)
 Amy Okonkwo (TCU)

See also
 2019 NCAA Division I women's basketball tournament
 2019 Women's Basketball Invitational

References

External links
 Official website WNIT Pre and Post Tournament

Women's National Invitation Tournament
Women's National Invitation Tournament
Women's National Invitation Tournament
Women's National Invitation Tournament
Women's National Invitation Tournament